NWFSC may refer to:

Northwest Fisheries Science Center, in Seattle, part of the National Marine Fisheries Service
Northwest Florida State College, in Niceville, part of the Florida College System